David Pérez (born April 6, 1990) is a Colombian football defender, who currently plays for Millonarios in the Copa Mustang.

References

External links
Profile at GolGolGol

1990 births
Living people
Colombian footballers
Millonarios F.C. players
Association football defenders
People from La Guajira Department